Eric Miller (born January 15, 1993) is an American professional soccer player who plays as a defender for Portland Timbers in Major League Soccer.

Club career

Early career
Born in Jacksonville, Florida and raised in Woodbury, Minnesota, Miller started playing soccer for the Bangu Tsunami and Minnesota Thunder Academy. In 2011 Miller won the Gatorade Player of the Year award and the Mr. Soccer Award for the state of Minnesota after scoring 16 goals and gaining 15 assists in his final year at Woodbury High School. He then went to Creighton University where he played for the Creighton Bluejays. Miller also played for two seasons with the Portland Timbers U23s in the USL PDL.

Montreal Impact
Miller was drafted by the Montreal Impact of Major League Soccer in the 2014 MLS SuperDraft with the fifth pick in the first round. He made his professional debut for the Impact on March 8, 2014 against FC Dallas.

Colorado Rapids
In February 2016, Miller was traded to Colorado Rapids in exchange for a first-round selection in the 2018 MLS SuperDraft and general allocation money.

Minnesota United
Miller, as well as $50,000 in General Allocation Money, was traded from Colorado to Minnesota on May 1, 2018. Colorado received Sam Nicholson in return, as well as an International Spot.

NYCFC
Miller was traded from Minnesota United to New York City FC on July 29, 2019 for $50,000 in General Allocation Money.

Nashville SC
On November 26, 2019, Miller was selected by Nashville SC in the 2019 MLS Re-Entry Draft.

Portland Timbers
On February 25, 2023, Miller signed as a free agent with Portland Timbers.

International career
In January 2016, Miller received his first call up to the senior United States squad for friendlies against Iceland and Canada.

Personal life
Miller has been in a relationship with Kassey Kallman since 2009. They married at the end of 2018.

Career statistics

Honors
Montreal Impact
Canadian Championship: 2014

References

External links

1993 births
Living people
American soccer players
American expatriate soccer players
Creighton Bluejays men's soccer players
Portland Timbers U23s players
CF Montréal players
FC Montreal players
Colorado Rapids players
Minnesota United FC players
New York City FC players
Nashville SC players
Portland Timbers players
Association football defenders
Expatriate soccer players in Canada
CF Montréal draft picks
USL League Two players
Major League Soccer players
USL Championship players
United States men's under-20 international soccer players
United States men's under-23 international soccer players
Soccer players from Minnesota
Soccer players from Jacksonville, Florida